Acta Astronomica is a quarterly peer-reviewed scientific journal covering astronomy and astrophysics. It was established in 1925 by the Polish astronomer Tadeusz Banachiewicz. Initially, the journal published articles in Latin, later English, French, and German were added as allowed journal languages. Nowadays, all papers are published in English. 

The journal is published by the Copernicus Foundation for Polish Astronomy and the editors-in-chief are M. Jaroszyński and Andrzej Udalski (University of Warsaw).

Abstracting and indexing
This journal is abstracted and indexed in Current Contents/Physical, Chemical & Earth Sciences, the Science Citation Index Expanded, and Scopus. 

According to the Journal Citation Reports, the journal has a 2021 impact factor of 1.974.

References

External links

Astronomy journals
Publications established in 1925
Quarterly journals
English-language journals
Academic journals published by non-profit organizations
Academic journals published in Poland